Wicewo  is a village in the administrative district of Gmina Tychowo, within Białogard County, West Pomeranian Voivodeship, in north-western Poland.

Notable residents
 Ewald Georg von Kleist (1700–1748), Lutheran cleric

References

Villages in Białogard County